The Matt Lucas Awards is a British entertainment series hosted by comedian and television personality Matt Lucas.

Background
The idea for The Matt Lucas Awards stemmed from And the Winner Is..., a radio series presented by Lucas for a number of years prior to the series. The format of the series involves a number of celebrity guests providing nominations for artists or objects in a number of weird and wonderful categories, the winner of which will receive a 'Lucas' award.

A pilot episode of the series was filmed in June 2011, and later released to the BBC iPlayer for internet viewing. The layout of the pilot consisted of Lucas in the centre of a studio of people, sitting on a couch, as if at an awards ceremony. Three guests would then come on, one at a time, and talk about one subject which they have a grievance with. The pilot received positive feedback from critics and audience alike, and as such, a full series of six episodes was commissioned by the BBC. Filming began in January 2012, with episodes airing from 10 April. Unlike the pilot, the series is set in a studio designed to look like Lucas' flat, and three guests each give a nomination in the same subject category, unlike the pilot, which was one subject per guest. Lucas' mother is also present in every episode. During the first series, musician David Arnold performed incidental music live in the studio. Each episode also features a performance section, where the guest must back up their nomination by giving a performance relating to it, such as singing, dancing or otherwise performing. Lucas performs the opening theme tune, and in the first series also sang variations on the theme live over the closing credits.
Several changes took place for the second series, the most noticeable being that Lucas no longer decides the winner from each category himself, but instead the winner is chosen by a panel of judges. Also, Arnold does not appear and any incidental music is no longer performed live.

Episode guide

Pilot

Series 1

Series 2

Christmas Special

References

External links

2010s British comedy television series
2012 British television series debuts
2013 British television series endings
BBC television comedy
English-language television shows
BBC television talk shows